Kerey is a salt lake in Nura District, Karaganda Region, Kazakhstan.

The lake lies in the northwestern sector of the district.

Geography

Kerey is shallow and its shores are marshy. It is an endorheic lake, having no outflow. A short spit projecting from the southeastern side divides the southern shore into two bays. There is a small island off the spit. Kerey is fed with snow, precipitation and groundwater. Its water level is usually at its highest in April and at its lowest in September. In years of drought the lake may dry up.

See also
Sor (geomorphology)
List of lakes of Kazakhstan

References

External links
SARYARKA - Steppe and Lakes of Northern Kazakhstan 
Northern Kazakhstan - Travel Guide

Lakes of Kazakhstan
Endorheic lakes of Asia
Karaganda Region
Tengiz basin